Grevillea muelleri is a species of flowering plant in the family Proteaceae and is endemic to the a relatively small area of south-western Western Australia. It is a shrub with linear to narrowly oblong, or divided leaves with linear or narrowly egg-shaped lobes, more or less spherical clusters of white to cream-coloured flowers.

Description
Leaves on flowering stems are usually narrower and shorter with fewer lobes.

TaxonomyGrevillea muelleri was first formally described in 1870 by George Bentham in Flora Australiensis from specimens collected by Ferdinand von Mueller at the summit of the Stirling Range. The specific epithet (muelleri'') honours the collector of the type specimens.

Distribution and habitat
This grevillea grows in forest and tall shrubland and is mainly restricted to the Stirling Range National Park in the Esperance Plains, Jarrah Forest and Mallee bioregions of south-western Western Australia.

See also
 List of Grevillea species

References

muelleri
Endemic flora of Western Australia
Eudicots of Western Australia
Proteales of Australia
Taxa named by George Bentham
Plants described in 1870